Darius Anthony Adams (born April 17, 1989) is an American-born naturalized Bulgarian professional basketball player for the Fujian Sturgeons of the Chinese Basketball Association (CBA).

Professional career
Adams went undrafted in the 2011 NBA draft. In February 2012, he joined Guaiqueríes de Margarita of Venezuela for the 2012 LPB season. Following the LPB season, he joined Los Prados of the Dominican Republic for the 2012 District National season. On June 9, 2012, he recorded a triple-double with 19 points, 11 rebounds, and 10 assists. In August 2012, he signed with Reales de La Vega, for the rest of the 2012 LNB season.

On January 12, 2013, Adams signed with SC Kryvbas of the Ukraine, for the rest of the 2012–13 season. In April 2013, he left Kryvbas and signed with Entente Orléanaise 45 of France, for the rest of the season.

On July 21, 2013, Adams signed with Eisbären Bremerhaven of Germany for the 2013–14 season. In 34 games, he averaged a league leading 18.0 points, as well as 4.1 rebounds, 4.0 assists, and 1.8 steals per game. In April 2014, he was named the 2014 BBL Best Offensive Player.

On July 1, 2014, Adams signed with SLUC Nancy of the French LNB Pro A. On December 24, 2014, he left Nancy and signed with Laboral Kutxa Baskonia of Spain, for the rest of the season.

On July 25, 2015, Adams re-signed with Laboral Kutxa Baskonia for one more season. He qualified to the 2016 Euroleague Final Four, and five days later, he scored 41 points in a Liga ACB game against Montakit Fuenlabrada, becoming the first player of the club in 25 years that made such a performance.

On July 29, 2016, Adams signed with Xinjiang Flying Tigers of the Chinese Basketball Association. During that season, Adams would not only prove to be a valuable player for the Flying Tigers, but also helped them to their best record of the CBA season and their fifth ever CBA Finals appearance. Adams was the team's MVP during that series, leading Xinjiang Flying Tigers to their first ever CBA Finals championship by sweeping the powerhouse Guangdong Southern Tigers 4–0.

Adams re-signed with Xinjiang Flying Tigers, appearing in all 41 games in the season while averaging 42.6 minutes per game. Adams averaged 38.7 points, 6.8 rebounds, 8.5 assists and 2.6 steals to lead the CBA in scoring per game in the regular season.

On January 4, 2022, Adams was acquired by the Birmingham Squadron of the NBA G League. He averaged 15.6 points, 4.4 rebounds, 4.1 assists, and 1.5 steals per game. On March 12, 2022, Adams was signed by the Fort Wayne Mad Ants.

Career statistics

EuroLeague

|-
| style="text-align:left;"| 2014–15
| style="text-align:left;"| Baskonia
| 14 || 10 || 26.0 || .445 || .417 || .864 || 2.4 || 2.8 || 1.1 || .1 || 12.2 || 10.2
|-
| style="text-align:left;"| 2015–16
| style="text-align:left;"| Baskonia
| 29 || 29 || 25.2 || .395 || .338 || .827 || 2.2 || 4.0 || 1.3 || .1 || 13.2 || 12.0
|- class="sortbottom"
| style="text-align:center;" colspan=2| Career
| 43 || 39 || 25.5 || .409 || .358 || .838 || 2.4 || 2.8 || 1.1 || .1 || 12.9 || 11.4

Liga ACB

CBA

References

External links
 Darius Adams at draftexpress.com
 Darius Adams at fiba.com (game center)
 eurobasket.com profile
 EuroLeague profile
 Liga ACB profile 
 Indianapolis Greyhounds bio
  at ballersabroad.com
 

1989 births
Living people
American expatriate basketball people in China
American expatriate basketball people in the Dominican Republic
American expatriate basketball people in France
American expatriate basketball people in Germany
American expatriate basketball people in Spain
American expatriate basketball people in Ukraine
American expatriate basketball people in Venezuela
American men's basketball players
Basketball players from Illinois
Birmingham Squadron players
Bulgarian men's basketball players
Eisbären Bremerhaven players
Fort Wayne Mad Ants players
Guaiqueríes de Margarita players
Indianapolis Greyhounds men's basketball players
Lincoln Lynx basketball players
Liga ACB players
Orléans Loiret Basket players
Point guards
Saski Baskonia players
SC Kryvbas players
SLUC Nancy Basket players
Sportspeople from Decatur, Illinois
Xinjiang Flying Tigers players